is a type of Shinto ritual ceremonial dance. The term is a contraction of the phrase , indicating the presence of gods in the practice.

Usually a female shaman will perform the dance and obtain the oracle from the god—in the setting, the dancer herself turns into god during the performance. Today, it is very much a living tradition, with rituals tied to the rhythms of the agricultural calendar, thriving primarily in parts of Shimane Prefecture, and urban centers such as Hiroshima.

Types of 

History
The epics  and  describe a folktale origin for the dances. In these texts, there is a famous legendary tale about the sun goddess Amaterasu, who retreated into a cave, bringing darkness and cold to the world. Ame-no-Uzume, goddess of the dawn and of revelry, led the other gods in a wild dance, and persuaded Amaterasu to emerge to see what the ruckus was all about.  is one of a number of rituals and arts said to derive from this event.

Originally called ,  began as sacred dances performed at the Imperial court by  who were supposedly descendants of Ame-no-Uzume. During the performance, the shrine maidens usually utilize a channeling device for god such as masks and spears to imitate the trance. With the  music that has the power to summon the gods, the  start to dance to transform themselves into the representation of the gods and receive messages as well as blessings from the deities. In 1871, Iwami Shinto offices claimed that theatrical  performed by priests in the west of Japan demeaned their dignity and therefore banned the performance. Owning to the support of civilian performing groups at that time, the performance pieces were still preserved.

Over time, however, these  performed within the sacred and private precincts of the Imperial courts, inspired popular ritual dances, called , which, being popular forms, practiced in villages all around the country, were adapted into various other folk traditions and developed into a number of different forms. Many more variations have developed over the centuries, including some which are fairly new, and most of which have become highly secularized folk traditions.

, in particular those forms that involve storytelling or reenactment of fables, is also one of the primary influences on the Noh theatre.

Imperial 

 is a ritual dance performed at the imperial court and at important Shinto shrines: Kamo-jinja and Iwashimizu Hachiman-gū. It consists of welcoming, entertaining and greeting the deities with humorous or poetic syllabic songs.

The  is the sacred vocal repertoire of 26 songs (etc.) traditionally performed by a male choir for several days, but reduced today to 12 chants performed in six hours.

There are several  dances, including:

The formal Imperial ritual dances were performed in a number of sacred places and on a number of special occasions. At the Imperial Sanctuary, where the Yata no kagami is kept, they are performed as part of  court music.  are also performed at the Imperial harvest festival and at major shrines such as Ise, Kamo, and Iwashimizu Hachiman-gū. Since around the year 1000, these events have taken place every year.

According to the ritual department of the Imperial Household Agency,  still take place every December in the Imperial Sanctuary and at the Imperial harvest festival ceremonies.

Folk 

A number of traditions of folk  exist:

These originally had a very loose form, akin to similar god-possession dances and rituals, but over time they have developed, into highly regular set forms. They are also performed at Buddhist temples as a martial arts performance.
 – dances based on those performed at Izumo Shrine serve a number of purposes, including ritual purification, celebration of auspicious days, and the reenactment of folktales. Originally quite popular in the Chūgoku region, near Izumo, these dances have spread across the country, and have developed over the centuries, becoming more of a secular folk entertainment and less of a formal religious ritual. The sacred dance of the Sada shrine has been inscribed on the UNESCO list of Intangible cultural heritage of humanity since 2011.
  – a form of dances derived from Yamabushi (a mobile group that embraces ascetic lives to gain power). This genre stresses on the power and energy. The performers always wear masks and use tools such as drum and sword to represent the magical power processed by Yamabushi. It was inscribed in 2009 as an Intangible cultural heritage of humanity by UNESCO.
 – a form of dances where  and priests dip bamboo leaves in hot water and splash the hot water on themselves by shaking the leaves, and then scattering the hot water to people around the area.
 – a form of lion dance, in which a group of dancers take on the role of the lion and parade around the town. The lion mask and costume is seen as, in some ways, embodying the spirit of the lion, and this is a form of folk worship and ritual, as other forms of lion dances are in Japan and elsewhere.
 – a form of dance deriving from rituals performed by traveling priests between Ise Grand Shrine and Atsuta Shrine, who would travel to villages, crossroads, and other locations to help the locals by driving away evil spirits. Acrobatic feats and lion dances played a major role in these rituals.

Around the time of the beginning of the Tokugawa shogunate (1603–1868), performances derived from this emerged in Edo as a major form of entertainment. Over the course of the period, these came to be more closely associated with  storytelling and other forms of popular entertainment.  continues to be performed to this day and include many elements of street entertainment.

See also
 Glossary of Shinto
 
 Mystery plays

References

Derived primarily from the Japanese Wikipedia article.
Giolai Andrea, Introducing Mikagura.Some Ethnomusicological Features of an Ancient Japanese Ritual, https://web.archive.org/web/20160316132415/http://www.centrostudiorientaliroma.net/introducing-mikagura-%e5%be%a1%e7%a5%9e%e6%a5%bd-some-ethnomusicological-features-of-an-ancient-japanese-ritual/?lang=en

External links
 

 
Dances of Japan
Japanese traditional music
Japanese words and phrases